Mama's Dirty Girls is a 1974 exploitation film starring Gloria Grahame and Candice Rialson about a woman and her three daughters who murder men for money.

Plot
Mama loves men, but she loves money even more. She's trained her three teenage daughters to meet, marry and murder men for their money. But soon they meet Harold and he's got other plans.

Cast
Gloria Grahame - Mama Love 
Paul Lambert - Harold 
Sondra Currie - Addie 
Candice Rialson - Becky  
Mary Stoddard - Cindy
Christopher Wines - Sheriff
Anneka De Lorenzo - Charity

Reception
Diabolique magazine said "The acting is fine and it’s a great concept... but the movie is never as much fun as you want it to be. They didn’t quite get the story right – the pace is too slow, unlike Big Bad Mama where there’s lots of action, here it’s mostly hanging around houses, and there’s no driving narrative. Also, who wants to watch a three girls film where the guys triumph?"

See also
 List of American films of 1974

References

External links

1970s exploitation films
1974 films
American exploitation films
Fictional quartets
Girls with guns films
1970s English-language films
Films directed by John Hayes
1970s American films